We Are For The Wild Places is the name of the second studio album released by New Zealand band Avalanche City released on 3 July 2015 through New Zealand subsidiary of the Warner Music Group label, Warner Music New Zealand.

Singles
 "Inside Out" was released as the album's lead single in 2015. 
 "Keep Finding A Way" was released in 2015.
 "I Need You" was released in 2016.

Track listing

References

2015 albums
Avalanche City albums